Spy Rock Road is the second and final studio album by the American punk rock band The Lookouts. It was released in 1989 through Lookout! Records

Track listing
"That Girl's from Outer Space" - 2:29
"Wild" - 3:37
"Alienation" - 4:35
"Generation" - 2:25
"The Green Hills of England" - 3:34
"Living Behind Bars" - 1:58
"Red Sea" - 3:06
"Sonny Boy" - 1:17
"Trees" - 5:11
"Life" - 3:32
"Friends" - 1:31

Personnel
 Larry Livermore - lead vocals, guitar
 Kain Kong - bass, backing vocals
 Tré Cool - drums, lead vocals on track 1 and 8

Additional performers
 Lint - lead guitar on tracks 6 and 8
 Kevin Army - acoustic guitar on tracks 5 and 7

Production
 Kevin Army - producer, engineer, mixing
 The Lookouts - producers
 M. - cover art
 D. - layout
 John Golden - mastering

References

1989 albums
The Lookouts albums
Lookout! Records albums